Gli anni struggenti (also titled II Concorrente) is a 1979 Italian film directed by Vittorio Sindoni and written by Nicola Badalucco with Sindoni.
It stars Fabio Traversa, Laura Lenzi and Gabriele Ferzetti. It received a middling review from Variety in which it was compared to Ermamno Olmi's The Job.

Cast
 Fabio Traversa: Saverio Bivona
 Laura Lenzi: Andreina
 Gabriele Ferzetti: Prof. Carmelo Bivona
 : Carmela, madre di Saverio
 : Grazia
 Giorgio Viterbo: Raffaele Cucinotta
 Nino Bontempo: Hotel night porter
 Paolo Fagone: Saverio as a child

References

External links

1979 films
Italian drama films
1970s Italian-language films
Films scored by Riz Ortolani
Films directed by Vittorio Sindoni
1970s Italian films